Buratino (Russian: Буратино) is the main character of Aleksey Nikolayevich Tolstoy's 1936 book The Golden Key, or the Adventures of Buratino, which is based on the 1883 Italian novel The Adventures of Pinocchio by Carlo Collodi. Buratino originated as a character in the commedia dell'arte. The name Buratino derives from the Italian burattino, which means "wooden puppet" or "doll". The book was published in 1936; the figure of Buratino quickly became hugely popular among children in the Soviet Union and remains so in Russia to this day (Buratino is one of the most popular characters of Russian children's literature). The story has been made into several films, including the animated 1959 film and the live-action 1975 film.

Origin
According to Tolstoy, he had read Pinocchio as a child, but, having lost the book, he started re-imagining it many years later in an attempt to come up with a series of bedside stories for his own children. The resulting tale proved to be so unique and was well-liked by the author's kids that he decided to write it down and publish it. Researchers, however, do not tend to find this explanation plausible, since the first Russian translation of Pinocchio didn't appear until Tolstoy was in his mid-twenties. Miron Petrovsky, in his article on the subject, states that the book was based upon a 1924 translation made by Nina Petrovskaya (1879-1928) and edited by Tolstoy, who had already removed many of the elements absent in The Golden Key.

Plot
Like Pinocchio, Buratino is a long-nosed wooden puppet.  According to the story, he is carved by Papa Carlo (the story's version of Geppetto) from a log, and suddenly comes to life. Upon creation, Buratino comes out long-nosed due to Papa Carlo's sloppy woodworking. Papa Carlo tries to shorten it, but Buratino resists.

Papa Carlo then sells his only good jacket in order to buy textbooks for Buratino and sends him to school. However, the boy becomes distracted by an advertisement for a local puppet theater show, and sells his textbooks to buy a ticket to the show. There he befriends other puppets, but the evil puppet-master Karabas Barabas (the story's Mangiafuoco character), wants to destroy him because Buratino disrupted the show.

Karabas Barabas releases Buratino after he learns that Papa Carlo's home contains a secret door for which Karabas has been searching. A Golden Key that Karabas once possessed, but later lost, opens this secret door. Karabas releases Buratino and even gives him five gold coins, asking only that Buratino watch after his father's home and make sure they do not move.

The story proceeds to tell of Buratino and his friends' hunt for the Golden Key and their struggle against the evil Karabas, his loyal friend Duremar, and a couple of crooks: Alice the Fox and Basilio the Cat (based on The Fox and the Cat), who are after Buratino's coins. After that, the events proceed similarly (although not identically) to Collodi's Pinocchio until the scene where the coins are stolen, after which the plots split apart completely.

Deviations from Collodi's story

 The Fairy with Turquoise Hair is in Tolstoy's version another puppet from Karabas's theatre, named Malvina. She retains the blue colour of her hair, her poodle servant (called Artemon by Tolstoy) and her function of saving Buratino from the Fox and the Cat who hanged him on a tree. To explain her presence in the forest, it is stated that she had escaped from the theatre earlier. She is represented as somewhat overprotective and less likable than Collodi's Fairy, yet she finally befriends Buratino.
 The character of Pierrot is introduced. He is in love with Malvina. Pierrot is represented as an archetypal poet (his poems are actually cited).
 Tolstoy omits most details which in the 20th century would be considered too gruesome or too moralistic, such as: Pinocchio having burned his feet; black rabbits pretending to be about to bury him; the whole Land of Toys subplot; the shark swallowing Pinocchio and his father, etc.
 Unlike Pinocchio in the original story, Buratino never becomes a real human. Quite the contrary, he is rewarded for not following the rules of what is assumed to be right behaviour (although he attempts to kill the Cricket and sells the book Papa Carlo sold his jacket to see the puppet show, Buratino is more heroic) and being nonconformist. In the finale, we see him playing in a new puppet theater of Carlo's.
 Buratino's nose does not grow when he lies.

Characters
Buratino is a wooden puppet with a long nose.
 Papa Carlo is a barrel organ player of little means, who created Buratino.
 Giuseppe (Джузеппе), nicknamed "Giuseppe the Blue Nose" for always being drunk, is a woodworker and a friend of Carlo. He wanted to make a table leg from the talking log, but got scared and finally gave the log as a present to Papa Carlo.
 Karabas Barabas (Карабас-Барабас) is an evil puppeteer. He owns a puppet theater with many marionettes, including Malvina, Pierrot, and Harlequin.
 Malvina (Мальвина) is a beautiful female puppet with blue hair.
 Artemon (Артемон) is Malvina's loyal poodle.
 Pierrot (Пьеро) is a sad puppet and a poet who is deeply in love with Malvina.
 Harlequin (Арлекин) is Pierrot's scene partner in Karabas's theatre. He usually mocks and beats Pierrot.
 Alice the Fox (Лиса Алиса) and Basilio the Cat (Кот Базилио), two swindlers.
 Tortila the Turtle (Черепаха Тортила) gives the Golden Key to Buratino, the same key that was lost by Karabas.
 Duremar (Дуремар) is a partner of Karabas Barabas who catches leeches for a living and so disturbs Tortilla's pond.

Adaptations
 The Golden Key, a 1939 movie combining live action and stop-motion animation.
 The Adventures of Buratino, a 1959 animated feature film by Soyuzmultfilm.
 The Adventures of Buratino, a 1975 live-action TV film.
 Buratino, Son of Pinocchio, a 2009 film.
  The computer game  was released in 1993, the first graphic adventure computer game released in the post-Soviet Russia.

In popular culture
The name Buratino has been and continues to be used as branding for a variety of products and stores marketed to children in Russia and the post-Soviet states — most notable of these are the  brand soft drink, which has a caramel taste, and "Golden Key" (Zolotoy klyuchik) toffee.

Buratino is also the nickname of the TOS-1 multiple launch rocket system, due to the big "nose" of the launcher.

A location in the story, Поле чудес [в Стране Дураков], literally "The Field of Wonders [in the Land of Fools]" is used for the Russian adaptation of the Wheel of Fortune game show.

References
Notes

External links

Buratino at sunbirds.com
Internet Movie Database:
1939 film
1960 film
1975 film
2009 film
1998 television episode (same as 1960 film, but with American soundtrack and voices)
  (English subtitles)

Russian culture
Characters in Russian novels of the 20th century
Works based on The Adventures of Pinocchio
Child characters in literature
1936 fantasy  novels